Dragan Tubak (born April 10, 1987) is a Serbian-Bosnian professional basketball player for SOA in Ivory Coast.

In December 2021, Tubak was on the roster of Ivorian club SOA to play in the 2022 BAL qualification.

References

External links
  at promotex.org
  at afrobasket.com
  at fiba.com

1987 births
Living people
Basketball League of Serbia players
Bosnia and Herzegovina men's basketball players
KK Borac Čačak players
KK Radnički FMP players
OKK Borac players
Leuven Bears players
SOA basketball players
Serbian expatriate basketball people in Belgium
Serbian expatriate basketball people in Bulgaria
Serbian expatriate basketball people in Georgia (country)
Serbian expatriate basketball people in Morocco
Serbian expatriate basketball people in North Macedonia
Serbian men's basketball players
Sportspeople from Banja Luka
RBC Pepinster players
Centers (basketball)
Serbs of Bosnia and Herzegovina